Lee Jin-ki (born December 14, 1989), better known by his stage name Onew, is a South Korean singer, songwriter, actor, and host. Born in Gwangmyeong, Gyeonggi-do, Onew was discovered at the 2006 SM Academy Casting and signed a contract with SM Entertainment the day after his audition. He debuted as the lead vocalist and leader of the boy group Shinee in May 2008, who went on to become one of the best-selling artists in South Korea.

As a singer, he has participated in the original soundtracks for various TV series and released collaborations with various artists. He made his solo debut on December 5, 2018, with the release of his first extended play, Voice, five days before his military conscription on December 10, 2018. The EP peaked at number two on South Korea's Circle Album Chart. He released his second EP Dice on April 11, 2022, which peaked at number three on Circle Album Chart. He made his solo debut in Japan on July 6, 2022, with the release of his first studio album  Life Goes On. He released his first Korean studio album Circle on March 6, 2023, which peaked at number three on Circle Album Chart. Onew has also contributed to songwriting for both himself and Shinee.

As an actor, Onew was cast in multiple musicals, such as Rock of Ages (2010), Shinheung Military Academy (2019), and Midnight Sun (2021–2022) and participated in various television dramas, mostly known for the roles of Baek Su in JTBC's sitcom Welcome to Royal Villa and the cardiothoracic resident Lee Chi-hoon in the popular KBS2 drama Descendants of the Sun (2016).

Career

2008–2009: Career beginnings and debut with Shinee

Onew was discovered at the 2006 SM Academy Casting. He received great appreciation from Lee Soo-man, SM Entertainment's founder, at Girls' Generation's debut showcase. Lee Soo-man noticed him and wanted to hear him sing during a one-time on the spot audition. He signed a contract with the company the day after he auditioned. In 2008, he was chosen as the leader of the group Shinee, and the five-member boy group debuted on May 25, 2008 on SBS' Inkigayo.

Shortly after debut, Onew contributed to singles for Lee Hyun-ji in 2008, for "Vanilla Love" and "Vanilla Love Part 2". In 2009, he recorded the song "One Year Later" with Girls' Generation member Jessica for the Genie EP. The same year, he also sang a duet with Kim Yeon-woo, "The Name I Loved", for Shinee's third EP 2009, Year of Us.

2010–2017: Musical theatre, acting debut, and solo activities
In 2010, Onew tried his hand at songwriting and, together with his bandmate Minho, wrote the lyrics for the song "Your Name" from Shinee's second studio album Lucifer. In addition to music, Onew became an MC of two programs—KBS2's Night Star, which he co-hosted alongside Shin Dong-yup, Yoon Jong-shin, movie director Jang Hang Joon, and Leessang's Gil, and MBC's Show! Music Core. Since his first job as an MC, Onew has hosted various events, such as Dream Concert, Incheon K-Pop Concert and Mnet's special event in Taiwan called Nihao Taiwan.

Onew starred in various musicals starting from 2010, debuting in the musical Brothers Were Brave alongside singer Lee Ji-hoon. He then starred in the Korean production of Rock of Ages playing the lead role, Drew. Onew has also showcased his acting skills via television like having a cameo role as a clumsy doctor in the drama Dr. Champ. He appeared in the drama's final episode. He also had cameo roles in the dramas Athena: Goddess of War, Oh My God x2, Pure Love and sitcom Royal Villa. In August 2012, Onew recorded a song titled "In Your Eyes" for the drama series To the Beautiful You. Onew also sang the soundtrack "Moonlight" for the drama Miss Korea. The song was released on January 3, 2014.

On January 14, 2014, his participation in the Borneo edition of the reality show Law of the Jungle was confirmed. He was also originally cast for the Brazil edition, but had to be replaced because of schedule conflicts. In addition to his group activities and his job as a MC, Onew gained experience in radio hosting and took over shows like Kiss the Radio, a popular radio program aired on KBS Cool FM which is hosted by his labelmates Super Junior. In June 2014, he was originally planning to appear in the musical Singin' in the Rain but was unable to join as he underwent vocal cord surgery.

In 2016, Onew was cast in the drama Descendants of the Sun, which starred Song Hye-kyo and Song Joong-ki. He portrayed first-year resident Dr. Lee Chi-hoon, a junior of Song Hye-kyo's character. The drama became a huge success, especially in China, where the series reached more than 2 billion views on the Chinese streaming site iQiyi. In Korea, the drama became a massive hit as well, surpassing more than 30 percent viewership ratings nationwide. Onew was awarded the Newcomer Scene Stealer Award at the 2016 Scene Stealer Festival for his role in Descendants of the Sun. Onew was also confirmed for a new tvN program Eat, Sleep, Eat which serves local recipes through Southeast Asia. On August 12, Onew and Lee Jin-ah released a duet, "Starry Night", as part of SM Station, a digital music project by SM Entertainment. It is a pop jazz song which is the work of numerous artists, including Andreas Oberg, a Swedish guitarist and songwriter, and singer-composer Yoo Hee-yeol. 
In October 2016, Onew wrote the song "So Amazing" for Shinee's fifth Korean studio album 1 of 1, and another song, "Beautiful Life", for its repackaged album, 1 and 1.

In May 2017, Onew and indie duo Rocoberry released the song "Lullaby" as part of SM Station. In June 2017, Onew was featured in Heize's music video for the song "I Don't Know You". In August 2017, shortly before the release of Age of Youth 2, Onew was accused of sexual harassment and decided to leave the project after discussions with the production staff of the show. Onew went into hiatus and did not participate in the remaining shows of Shinee's 2017 concert tour in Japan. On April 6, 2018, after eight months of investigation, the prosecution dropped all charges against him.

2018–2021: Korean solo debut with Voice and military service

In May 2018, Onew was featured in Kim Yeon-woo's fifth studio album in the song "Play the Field", which he helped write. This marked his first time contributing to songwriting for an artist other than Shinee.

Onew's debut EP, Voice, was released on December 5, 2018, with the lead single "Blue". It included two songs co-written by Onew, "Shine On You" and "Illusion". The EP peaked at number two on South Korea's Circle Album Chart. Onew was unable to promote the EP as he enlisted for his mandatory military service on December 10, 2018, just five days after its release.

In January 2019, Onew joined the military musical Shinheung Military Academy, which tells the story of patriotic youths who fought to gain independence from Japan. On April 11, 2019, he performed part of the musical at the 100th anniversary of the establishment of South Korea's provisional government. Onew joined another military musical in August 2019 together with Exo member Xiumin. He was cast in the new army musical titled Return: The Promise of That Day as the young Seung-ho who fought during the Korean War. It is an original army musical and deals with the topic of excavating the remains of the heroic soldiers who sacrificed themselves to protect their country during the Korean War.

Onew was officially discharged from the military on July 8, 2020, 12 days earlier than his expected date of discharge in light of South Korea's efforts to combat COVID-19.

In January 2021, Onew resumed activities as part of Shinee. On February 4, 2021, Onew released a song titled "Shadow" as a soundtrack for the drama series Breakup Probation: One Week. In May 2021, Onew was cast in the musical Midnight Sun as the male lead Ha-ram. For the musical soundtrack, Onew released two songs, "Meet Me When the Sun Goes Down" and "Good-bye Days" which is a duet with  Kei. In July 2021, Onew appeared as a regular cast member on Sea of Hope, a variety show where celebrities cook and sing for guests. On August 3, 2021, Onew released a song titled "Dear My Spring" as a soundtrack for the drama series You Are My Spring. In September 2021, Onew joined the cast of March of the Ants Chapter 5, a reality show about investing in the stock market. On October 5, 2021, Onew and Elaine released a duet, "Blue", as part of the soundtrack for the drama series High Class.

In November 2021, Onew took part in the Korea On Stage project for which he visited and filmed singing performances at Yangdong Folk Village as part of The Cultural Heritage Administration and The Korea Cultural Heritage Foundation's tourist campaign to promote Korea's Cultural Heritage. In December 2021, Onew was cast in  SM C&C Studio’s web variety show Soldier Idol Camp and short-form horror series 4 Minutes and 44 Seconds.  On December 6, 2021, Onew and Punch released a duet, "Way", as part of SM Station. The single featured lyrics written by Onew alongside established songwriter Kim Eana. On December 27, 2021, Onew, alongside labelmates Kyuhyun and Taeil, released the song "Ordinary Day" for SM Entertainment's winter album 2021 Winter SM Town: SMCU Express.

2022: Dice, Japanese solo debut and first solo concert tour
On February 27, Onew released a song titled "Mind Warning" as a soundtrack for the drama series Forecasting Love and Weather. In March, it was announced that Onew would reprise his role as Ha-ram for the 2022 production of Midnight Sun. In the musical soundtrack released on April 30, Onew participated in two songs, "The Sun is in My Eyes" and a duet, "A Melody Called You", with  Kim Nam-joo.

On April 11, Onew's second EP, Dice, was released with the lead single of the same name. This marked Onew's first solo comeback after his discharge from the military and his first time promoting as a soloist. He stated that he sought diversity with this EP; like the six-faced object, it consists of six tracks showing different aspects of him as a soloist. One of the tracks is "In the Whale", a special song showing his affection and gratefulness to fans, which Onew wrote lyrics for. The EP peaked at number three on Circle Album Chart.

As a pre-release of his Japanese debut album, Onew released a digital EP, Who Sings? Vol.1, on June 1. The EP includes four cover songs: Kazumasa Oda's "Kirakira", which was pre-released at midnight on May 18, Motohiro Hata's "Uroko", which was pre-released at midnight on May 25, Misia's "Everything", and Dreams Come True's "Yasashii Kissete".

On July 6, Onew released his first Japanese studio album, Life Goes On with the lead single of the same name which was pre-released on June 22. Before its physical release, the album was released digitally on June 29. The album contains 10 tracks including six original tracks and the four covers previously included in Who Sings? Vol.1. On July 8, he embarked on his first solo concert tour in Japan, starting with a concert at the Nippon Budokan in Tokyo. The tour consisted of eight sold-out concerts stopping at four cities. Six concerts were originally scheduled, with two additional performances added later to accommodate demand, and took place on September 10 and 11 at Yoyogi National Gymnasium in Tokyo. On September 9, Onew released his Japanese single titled "Dance Whole Day" which was specially prepared to be performed at his last additional concerts. The single was later released in Korea on September 15. The last concert of the tour was broadcast live on TBS Television.

On December 26, Onew released songs "The Cure" and "Where You Are", collaborating with other labelmates for SM Entertainment's winter album 2022 Winter SM Town: SMCU Palace. "The Cure", which is the album's lead single, shares a message of solidarity with the global movement to combat climate change to embrace a sustainable future.

2023: First Korean solo concert and Circle

On January 26, it was announced that Onew will hold his first Korean concert, titled O-New-Note, at the Olympic Hall in Seoul on March 4–5. An additional concert on March 3 was later added after tickets were sold out upon release. The last day of the concert was live-streamed globally online through Beyond Live and was simultaneously watched in 74 regions around the world.

On March 6, Onew released his first Korean studio album, Circle with the lead single "O (Circle)". The album contains ten songs in which he tried different methods of singing exhibiting his musical tastes rather than showing off what he can do. He also chose the words "healing," "recovery" and "circulation" as the album's keywords. The album peaked at number three on Circle Album Chart.

On March 14–15, Onew held his concert O-New-Note in Japan at the Yoyogi National Gymnasium in Tokyo attracting 22,000 people. At the concert, he sang a new unreleased Japanese single titled "Inspiration". It was announced that both "Inspiration" and another Japanese single titled "Knock On My Door" will be released on March 22.

Personal life
Onew is the only child of his parents. He became interested in music at a young age when he started to play the piano. Later, his passion inspired him to pursue a career in the music industry.
Onew graduated from the Gwangmyeong Information Industry High School. In his senior year, he ranked second in his grade and held the highest national score for his high school SATs exam. He started attending Chungwoon University where he majored in broadcasting music. After receiving his bachelor's degree he continued to attend the university for his master's degree which he earned in practical music.

Vocals
Onew is one of the main vocalists of Shinee and is known for his distinctively unique vocal color and for his calm and understated voice, providing the strong vocal foundation of the group with fellow member Jonghyun. In June 2014, Onew underwent a vocal cord polyp removal and vocal fold mucosa reconstruction operation, which made him unable to sing for a few months. On December 2014, Kim Yeon-woo, Onew's vocal coach, revealed during a radio broadcast that Onew's condition had improved after the surgery. He also confirmed that Onew's vocal range "improved and he can make sounds comfortably too".

Philanthropy
In order to support Onew in the musical Rock of Ages, in 2010, his fans had donated 1.44 tons of rice, a common practice for fans in South Korea, with the expectation that the idol will then donate to a charity of their choice—Onew donated it to help feed North Korean children, which was prepared by the Child Development Program. Onew also donated 770 kg of rice to children in need in South Korea in May 2010. In 2016, Onew donated roughly 1.2 million won to the Korean Heart Association.

Controversy

Harassment allegations
In August 2017, Onew was accused of sexual harassment. The victim stated that on August 12 in a night club in Gangnam, Onew, who was intoxicated, touched her leg two or three times as he tried to stand up, over the course of two hours while she was dancing on one of the club's multiple dancing platforms that was adjacent to where Onew was seated. However, she acknowledged that such incidents could happen under the influence of alcohol and withdrew the charge. Nevertheless, the case was forwarded to the prosecution as a recommendation for indictment without detention. After a four-month hiatus, Onew posted a letter of apology, which was accepted widely among his fans, but others called for him to step down from Shinee. On April 5, 2018, SM Entertainment announced that the charges against him had been dismissed by the prosecutors.

Discography

 Life Goes On (2022)
 Circle (2023)

Filmography

Film

Television

Variety shows

Web shows

Musical theatre

Concerts and tours

Headlining
 Onew Japan 1st Concert Tour 2022 〜Life Goes On〜 (2022)
 Onew 1st Concert "O-New-Note" (2023)

Concert participation
 SM Town Live 2022: SMCU Express at Kwangya (2022)
 We Are All One – Let's Love K-pop Concert (2022)
 SM Town Live 2022: SMCU Express at Tokyo (2022)
 SM Town Live 2023: SMCU Palace at Kwangya (2023)

Awards and nominations

References

External links

 Onew at SM Town

Shinee members
Japanese-language singers
South Korean male idols
South Korean pop singers
South Korean male singers
South Korean dance musicians
South Korean male musical theatre actors
South Korean television presenters
South Korean radio presenters
South Korean male television actors
South Korean singer-songwriters
Living people
SM Entertainment artists
South Korean male singer-songwriters
1989 births